2091 Sampo, provisional designation , is a stony Eos asteroid and relatively slow rotator from the outer region of the asteroid belt, approximately 30 kilometers in diameter. It was discovered on 26 April 1941, by Finnish astronomer Yrjö Väisälä at Turku Observatory, Finland, and named after Sampo from Finnish mythology.

Orbit and classification 

Sampo is a member of the Eos family, the largest asteroid family in the outer main belt consisting of nearly 10,000 asteroids. It orbits the Sun in at a distance of 2.8–3.2 AU once every 5 years and 3 months (1,911 days). Its orbit has an eccentricity of 0.06 and an inclination of 11° with respect to the ecliptic.

Physical characteristics 

The S-type asteroid measures between 23.0 and 35.5 kilometers in diameter, and its surface has an albedo between 0.118 and 0.277, according to the surveys carried out by IRAS, Akari, and NEOWISE.

A rotational lightcurve of Sampo was obtained from photometric observations made by astronomers René Roy, Laurent Bernasconi and Stéphane Charbonnelat in March 2003. It gave a potentially long rotation period of  hours with a brightness variation of 0.38 magnitude.

Naming 

This minor planet was named after the wonder-object Sampo from Finnish mythology. It is mentioned in the national oral folklore and mythology epic, Kalevala, after which the minor planet 1454 Kalevala is named. Sampo was to produce every kind of fortune. When Kalevala and Pohjola (also see 3606 Pohjola) were fighting for its possession it broke into pieces. The official naming citation was published by the Minor Planet Center on 1 August 1980.

References

External links 
 Asteroid Lightcurve Database (LCDB), query form (info )
 Dictionary of Minor Planet Names, Google books
 Asteroids and comets rotation curves, CdR – Observatoire de Geneve, Raoul Behrend
 Discovery Circumstances: Numbered Minor Planets (1)-(5000)  – Minor Planet Center
 
 

 

002091
Discoveries by Yrjö Väisälä
Named minor planets
19410426